The Elbow Range is a mountain range in Clark County, Nevada.

References 

Mountain ranges of Nevada
Mountain ranges of Clark County, Nevada